The 2023 Wisconsin Spring Election is scheduled to be held in the U.S. state of Wisconsin on April 4, 2023.  The featured race at the top of the ticket is for an open seat on the Wisconsin Supreme Court, which has already become the most expensive judicial election in history.  Several other nonpartisan local and judicial offices will also be on the April 4 ballot, including mayoral elections in some of Wisconsin's larger cities—Green Bay, Madison, and Racine.  In addition, a special election is to be held in the 8th State Senate district, concurrent with the Spring elections.  The 2023 Wisconsin Spring Primary was held February 21, 2023.

State elections

Legislature

State Senate 8th district special election
A special election will be held concurrent with the spring general to fill the 8th State Senate seat vacated by the resignation of Alberta Darling.  Republican state representative Dan Knodl will face Democratic attorney Jodi Habush Sinykin in the special election scheduled for April 4, 2023.

The primary for this election was held concurrent with the spring primary, February 21, 2023.  Knodl prevailed in the Republican primary over state representative Janel Brandtjen and Thiensville village president Van Mobley. Former state senator Randy Hopper briefly entered the race, but then withdrew and endorsed Knodl.

Judicial

State Supreme Court 

A regularly scheduled Wisconsin Supreme Court election will be held on April 4, 2023.  The incumbent judge, Patience D. Roggensack, is retiring after 20 years on the court.  Milwaukee County circuit judge Janet Protasiewicz will face former Wisconsin Supreme Court justice Daniel Kelly in the April 4 general election.  Circuit judges Jennifer Dorow of Waukesha County and Everett Mitchell of Dane County were eliminated in the February primary. Kelly and Dorow are considered conservatives, while Mitchell and Protasiewicz are considered liberals. This election will decide the balance of power on the court for at least the next two years, until the next scheduled Supreme Court election in 2025.

The 2023 Wisconsin supreme court election has been described as the most important election of the year. In 2020 allies of former president Donald Trump attempted to challenge the Wisconsin result of the US general election of 2019; the Wisconsin supreme court rejected the attempt by a one-vote margin. A Republican victory would lead to a Supreme Court which might in similar circumstances disrupt a democratically decided election. The parties both know what is at stake, and between them by 20 March 2023 had spent far had jointly spent US$27m on their campaigns, very much more than usual for this type of election.

State Court of Appeals 
Two seats on the Wisconsin Court of Appeals are scheduled for election on April 4, 2023.  
 In District I, William W. Brash III, chief judge of the Court of Appeals, is running for second full six-year term in 2023.  He was appointed by Governor Scott Walker in 2015 and was elected to his first full term in 2017.  He faces Milwaukee labor and employment attorney Sara Geenen. 
 In District IV, incumbent Michael R. Fitzpatrick will not run for re-election. Dane County circuit judge Chris Taylor is the only candidate for this seat.

State Circuit Courts 
Forty nine of the state's 261 circuit court seats will be up for election in April 2023.  This total includes four new seats to be created due to a 2020 act of the Legislature.  Only 11 seats are contested, and only four incumbent judges are facing a challenger.
 In Clark County, attorneys William Bratcher and Jake Brunette are running for a newly created judicial seat.
 In Grant County, former Jefferson County circuit judge Jennifer Day will face Grant County district attorney Lisa A. Riniker for the judicial seat being vacated by Judge Robert P. VanDeHey.  Lancaster attorney Jeffrey W. Erickson was eliminated in the primary.
 In Oneida County, incumbent judge Mary Roth Burns faces a challenge from Oneida County district attorney Michael W. Schiek.  Oneida County corporation counsel Mike Fugle was eliminated in the primary.
 In Sawyer County, Thomas J. Duffy and Monica Isham Chase are running for a newly created judicial seat.
 In Sheboygan County Branch 2, municipal judge Natasha L. Torry is running for the judicial seat being vacated by Judge Kent Hoffman.  Former assistant district attorney James A. Haasch dropped out of the race but will still appear on the ballot.
 In Sheboygan County Branch 5, public defender Cassandra Van Gompel and attorney George Limbeck are running for the judicial seat being vacated by Judge Daniel Borowski.
 In Vernon County, district attorney Timothy J. Gaskell and attorney Angela Lynn Palmer-Fisher are running for the judicial seat being vacated by Judge Darcy Rood.
 In Washington County, incumbent judge Ryan J. Hetzel faces a challenge from Hartford attorney Russell Jones.
 In Waukesha County, incumbent judge Fred Strampe faces a challenge from former state representative Cody Horlacher.
 In Winnebago County, incumbent judge Scott C. Woldt faces a challenge from former Winnebago County circuit judge LaKeisha D. Haase.
 In Wood County, district attorney Craig Lambert and Wisconsin Rapids attorney Timothy Gebert are running for a newly created judicial seat.

Constitutional Amendment
There will be two amendments to the Constitution of Wisconsin on the ballot for the Spring general election, April 4, 2023.  The proposed amendments are structured as two questions to voters for consideration of separate changes to Section 8 of Article I of the Wisconsin Constitution, dealing with conditions for pre-trial release of those accused of crimes.

 For Question 1, a "yes" vote would raise the conditions necessary for release, removing the word "bodily" from the phrase "All persons, before conviction, shall be eligible for release under reasonable conditions designed to ... protect members of the community from serious bodily harm".  
 For Question 2, a "yes" vote would insert an additional paragraph allowing judges wider latitude for when to apply cash bail for people accused of violent crimes.  The current language of the constitution allows imposition of cash bail only in situations where it is believed "necessary to assure appearance in court."  The amendment would allow judges to impose cash bail (on those accused of a violent crime) based on the "totality of the circumstances".

A lawsuit alleged that the Republican legislature had missed the deadline for these questions to appear on the April ballot, but the questions were allowed to proceed and will appear on the ballot.

Local elections

Brown County

Green Bay mayor

 A regularly scheduled mayoral election is to be held in Green Bay, Wisconsin, concurrent with the Spring general election. Incumbent mayor Eric Genrich has indicated he will run for a second four-year term.  He will face former state representative Chad Weininger in the general election.

Howard village president
 A regularly scheduled election for village president will be held in Howard, Wisconsin, concurrent with the Spring general election. Incumbent Burt McIntyre is running for re-election, and will face IT professional J. D. Kopp in the April general election.

Dane County

Madison mayor 
 A regularly scheduled mayoral election is to be held in Madison, Wisconsin, concurrent with the Spring general election. Incumbent mayor Satya Rhodes-Conway has indicated she will run for a second four-year term.  She will face former deputy mayor and Madison Metropolitan School District School Board President Gloria Reyes in the general election.  Scott Kerr, a career city employee of the city of Madison, was eliminated in the primary.  Daniel Howell, a recent University of Wisconsin graduate, missed the filing deadline and ran an unsuccessful write-in campaign in the primary.

Middleton mayor 
 A regularly scheduled mayoral election is to be held in Middleton, Wisconsin, concurrent with the Spring general election.  Incumbent mayor Gurdip Brar is not running for a third term.  City councilmembers Emily Kuhn and Kathy Olson will compete for the office in the April general election.

Outagamie County

Outagamie County executive
 A regularly scheduled county executive election is to be held in Outagamie County, Wisconsin, concurrent with the Spring general election.  Incumbent executive Tom Nelson is running for a 4th four-year term.  Nelson will face former county board member Kevin Sturn in the general election.  County board member Justin Krueger was eliminated in the primary.

Racine County

Racine mayor 
 A regularly scheduled mayoral election is to be held in Racine, Wisconsin, concurrent with the Spring general election.  Incumbent mayor Cory Mason has indicated he will run for a second full four-year term.  He will face city councilmember Henry Perez in the general election.  Retirement financial advisor Jim DeMatthew was eliminated in the February primary.

Mount Pleasant village board
 A regularly scheduled village board election is to be held in Mount Pleasant, Wisconsin, concurrent with the Spring general election.  Incumbent village president Dave DeGroot is running for re-election, along with 3 of the 6 trustees.  They face a challenge from a slate of village residents opposed to the Foxconn in Wisconsin project, and the handling of that issue by the village government.  Incumbent president Dave DeGroot will face activist Kelly Gallaher.  Trustee Nancy Washburn will face Kim Mahoney, who was a long-time holdout against relocating from the Foxconn site.  Trustee John Hewitt will face Travis Yanke, a project manager at AbbVie.  Trustee Ram Bhatia will face accountant Eric Martinez.

References

External links
Wisconsin Elections Commission official information for and about voters, elections and candidates
Candidates at Vote Smart  

 
2023
Wisconsin